Lozice is a municipality and village in Chrudim District in the Pardubice Region of the Czech Republic. It has about 200 inhabitants.

History
The first written mention of Lozice is from 1131.

References

External links

Villages in Chrudim District